Tommy Carroll may refer to:
 Tommy Carroll (artist), Aboriginal Australian artist at Warmun Art Centre, Turkey Creek, Western Australia

 Tommy Carroll (criminal) (1901–1934), American bank robber and depression-era outlaw

 Tommy Carroll (footballer) (1942–2020), Irish international footballer

 Tommy Carroll (hurler) (1898–1979), Irish hurler

See also
Thomas Carroll (disambiguation)